Mazuma, Nevada was a small mining town in Pershing County, Nevada where eight people were killed in a flash flood on July 11, 1912.

Mazuma was founded in 1907 and a post office was established on August 28, 1907. The name "Mazuma" is derived from a Yiddish slang word for money: m'zumon.  Other sources indicate that m'zumon means "the ready necessary".

Just after 5pm on July 12, 1912, a  wall of water was observed upstream from Mazuma at the Seven Troughs Canyon. The Seven Troughs Cyanide Plant was destroyed, releasing dozens of gallons of cyanide into the flood. A phone call was made, but due to the electrified atmosphere, the only word that could be heard at Mazuma was "water." Over the following weeks, relief efforts included visits by doctors and nurses from as far as Reno. A statewide relief fund was set up. In addition, a relief fund was set up by the San Francisco Examiner, where William Randolph Hearst personally donated $100.

Postmistress Maude Ruddell was killed in the flood when the post office collapsed on her.  The post office formally moved from Mazuma to Seven Troughs on November 30, 1912.

The Mazuma Hills Mill, located upstream of Mazuma, burned down 13 days after the flood, though the Darby Mill located southwest of Mazuma, operated from 1909 until it was dismantled in 1918.

References 

Ghost towns in Pershing County, Nevada
Populated places established in 1907
1907 establishments in Nevada
1907 natural disasters in the United States